The Dusse-Alin Tunnel is a two-kilometre-long railway tunnel on the Baikal–Amur Mainline (BAM) in Siberia, 88 kilometres east of Novy Urgal. Although it is named after the Dusse-Alin located about  further northeast, here the line crosses the Bureya Range to enter the Amgun River valley just north of the Badzhal Range.

Construction
Work started in 1939. Gulag prisoners arrived on foot, provided only with hand tools, one horse and a single motorized cart.  In 1940 the guard commander shot the chief engineer in the back, an act that was ruled an accident (the engineer, Konserov, had previously received an Order of Lenin for his work on the White Sea–Baltic Canal).  Work stopped in 1942 and resumed in 1947.  The tunnel was officially opened in 1950, but was never used because the rest of the BAM was incomplete. Work on the BAM stopped after Stalin's death in 1953.  Water leaked into the abandoned tunnel and it eventually became filled with ice.

Work was resumed in 1974 using railway troops, a group comparable to the US Army Corps of Engineers. They moved into the former gulag barracks, but the barbed wire and watch towers left no doubt as to where they were.  When work started more reminders were found, including frozen corpses and a candlestick holder made from a skull. Letters home caused a scandal and a commission was sent out from Moscow.  The commission concluded that the political education of the soldiers was poor and that it was inappropriate to house them in former prisoners' barracks.  In just ten days, the entire camp was leveled, including the cemetery, and all signs of the previous workers were destroyed.

The troops used the backblast from jet engines to melt the 32,000 cubic meters of ice. The tunnel was cleared by 1974, but was not officially opened until November 1982 when the first train traveled from Novy Urgal to Komsomolsk-on-Amur.

See also
 Severomuysky Tunnel, the longest tunnel on the BAM

References

 

Buildings and structures in Khabarovsk Krai
Railway tunnels in Russia
Rail transport in Siberia
Tunnels completed in 1950